As of October 2022, Delta Connection serves 211 destinations in the United States, Canada, Cuba, and the Bahamas -- of those, 117 are served by multiple Delta Connection flagged airlines, while 129 are also served by Delta mainline flights.

Number of Delta Connection destinations, per airline.

Destinations
Sortable list of Delta Connection destinations.

References

External links
 Delta Air Lines website

Lists of airline destinations
Destinations